The Speaker of the New South Wales Legislative Assembly is the presiding officer of the Legislative Assembly, New South Wales's lower chamber of Parliament. The current Speaker is Jonathan O'Dea, who was elected on 7 May 2019. Traditionally a partisan office, filled by the governing party of the time, O'Dea replaced the previous Liberal Speaker Shelley Hancock, following the 2019 state election.

Role
The Speaker presides over the House's debates, determining which members may speak.  The Speaker is also responsible for maintaining order during debate, and may punish members who break the rules of the House. Conventionally, the Speaker remains non-partisan, and renounces all affiliation with his former political party when taking office. The Speaker does not take part in debate nor vote (except to break ties, and even then, subject to conventions that maintain his or her non-partisan status), although the Speaker is still able to speak. Aside from duties relating to presiding over the House, the Speaker also performs administrative and procedural functions, and remains a constituency Member of Parliament (MP).

The office of the Speaker is recognised in section 31 of the Constitution Act 1902 as the Legislative Assembly's "independent and impartial representative". The first act of the new Parliament, after the swearing in of Members, is the election of a Speaker. Section 31B of the Constitution Act outlines the method of election. Under section 70 of the Parliamentary Electorates and Elections Act 1912, the Speaker issues writs to fill vacancies caused otherwise than by a General Election, which would be issued by the Governor.

The Speaker's role in the House is to maintain order, put questions after debate and conduct divisions. In maintaining order the Speaker interprets and applies the Standing Orders and practice of the House by making rulings and decisions.

The Speaker also has extensive administrative functions, being responsible, with the President, for the overall direction of the Parliament. In this, the Presiding Officers are advised by the Clerks of both Houses. The Speaker is solely responsible for the operation of the Department of the Legislative Assembly.

If only one candidate is nominated for election, then no ballot is held, and the Assembly proceeds directly to the motion to appoint the candidate to the Speakership. A similar procedure is used if a Speaker seeks a further term after a general election: no ballot is held, and the Assembly immediately votes on a motion to re-elect the Speaker. If the motion to re-elect the Speaker fails, candidates are nominated, and the Assembly proceeds with voting. Upon the passage of the motion, the Speaker-elect is expected to show reluctance at being chosen. Customarily the speaker-elect is "dragged unwillingly" by MPs to the Speaker's bench. This custom has its roots in the Speaker's original function of communicating the House of Commons' opinions to the monarch. Historically, the Speaker, representing the House to the Monarch, potentially faced the Monarch's anger and therefore required some persuasion to accept the post.

After election, the Speaker ceases to be associated with his or her former party. In 2007, Richard Torbay was the first independent Speaker since 1917, breaking a pattern of alternation between Labor and Conservative members which had occurred from the 1917 through to the 2003 elections of Speakers.

Many Speakers also held higher or other offices while in Parliament: The first Speaker, Sir Daniel Cooper (1856–1860) was later made a Baronet, of Woollahra in New South Wales, in 1863; William Arnold (1865–1875) served in the Robertson and Cowper Ministries before becoming Speaker; Sir George Wigram Allen (1875–1882) also served as a Minister in the first Parkes Government; Edmund Barton (1883–1887) entered the new Federal Parliament in 1901 as the first Prime Minister of Australia (1901–1903) and thereafter served as a Puisne Justice of the High Court of Australia until 1920; James Dooley (1925–1927) before taking up the role of Speaker had served two terms as the Premier of New South Wales in 1921 and from 1921 to 1922; Reginald Weaver (1937–1941), later served briefly as Leader of the Opposition of New South Wales and as the first Leader of the NSW Liberal Party in 1945 before his death and John Aquilina (2003–2007) also served as a Minister in the Unsworth and Carr Labor Governments.

Dress
Following the Westminster tradition inherited from the House of Commons of the United Kingdom, the traditional dress of the speaker includes components of Court dress such as the black silk lay-type gown (similar to a QC's gown), a lace collar or jabot (another variation included a white bow tie with a lace jabot), bar jacket, white gloves and a full-bottomed wig. Often the dress variated according to the party in power, with most Labor party speakers eschewing the wig while retaining the court dress, while conservative and independent speakers tended to wear the full dress.

The Speaker, currently, no longer wears the traditional court dress outfit. Kevin Rozzoli was the last speaker to do so. From 1995 to 2007, Speakers Murray and Aquilina opted not to wear any element of the traditional outfit, preferring business attire as appropriate for a member of parliament. Speaker Torbay also chose not to wear the full court dress of the speaker upon his election in 2007, nevertheless he returned to tradition by wearing the gown during question time and significant occasions such as the Budget. Speakers Hancock and O'Dea have continued this practice. However, there is nothing stopping any given Speaker, if they choose to do so, from assuming the traditional court dress or anything they deem appropriate.

Speakers of the Legislative Assembly

Deputy and Assistant Speakers

Deputy Speakers

Assistant Speakers

References

External links
 The NSW Legislative Assembly
 Parliament of NSW – Presiding officers
 NSW Parliamentary Record

New South Wales